The Magnolia Electric Co. is the seventh and final album by Songs: Ohia. It was recorded by Steve Albini at Electrical Audio in Chicago and released by Secretly Canadian on March 4, 2003. The naming of the album and comments by Jason Molina have led to discussions whether it is not simultaneously, in fact, the debut album by Molina's new band, also named Magnolia Electric Co.

The artwork for the album does not contain the name Songs: Ohia anywhere, though the center label of the vinyl record does say "Songs: Ohia." On the other hand, the album was recorded with different musicians than the later members of Magnolia Electric Co., and the decision to take on the new name was not announced until the tour following the release in the spring of 2003. Molina later declared Didn't It Rain to be the final Songs: Ohia album.

Composition
Magnolia digs into alt-country and "red-blood, full-throated" country rock, as well as seeing the band draw from both “orthodox” Americana and “otherworldly atmosphere”. It also works in roots rock, while the arrangements and songwriting echo 70s outlaw country.

Track listing 
Original release
All songs written by Jason Molina.
 "Farewell Transmission" – 7:22
 "I've Been Riding with the Ghost" – 3:20
 "Just Be Simple" – 4:20
 "Almost Was Good Enough" – 4:28
 "The Old Black Hen" – 5:48
 "Peoria Lunch Box Blues" – 5:48
 "John Henry Split My Heart" – 6:09
 "Hold on Magnolia" – 7:51

The Japanese edition contains an additional track, "The Big Game Is Every Night". The first U.S. edition contained a bonus disk of demo recordings by Jason Molina.

Deluxe edition reissue, November 2013
LP 1 (The Magnolia Electric Co.)
 "Farewell Transmission"
 "I've Been Riding With the Ghost"
 "Just Be Simple"
 "Almost Was Good Enough"
 "The Old Black Hen"
 "Peoria Lunch Box Blues"
 "John Henry Split My Heart"
 "Hold On Magnolia"

LP 2 (Jason Molina's demos for The Magnolia Electric Co.)
 "Farewell Transmission" (Demo)
 "I've Been Riding With the Ghost" (Demo)
 "Just Be Simple" (Demo)
 "The Old Black Hen" (Demo)
 "Peoria Lunch Box Blues" (Demo)
 "John Henry Split My Heart" (Demo)
 "Hold On Magnolia" (Demo)
 "The Big Game Is Every Night" (Demo)
 "Whip Poor Will" (Demo)

10″ (Studio Outtakes)
A – "The Big Game Is Every Night"
B – "Whip Poor Will"

The 10” was only available with the first 3,000 copies of the 2xLP. Both tracks are included at the end of first CD on the 2xCD edition.

Recording information 
 Jason Molina – voice, guitar
 Jennie Benford – voice, mandolin
 Mike Brenner – lapsteel
 "Three Nickel" Jim Grabowski – piano, organ, wurlitzer
 Dan Macadam – guitar, voice, violin
 Jeff Panall – drums
 Lawrence Peters – voice (on "The Old Black Hen")
 Scout Niblett – voice (on "Peoria Lunchbox Blues")
 Dan Sullivan – guitar
 Rob Sullivan – bass
 Songs by Jason Molina
 Recorded by Steve Albini

References

External links 
 Secretly Canadian press release
 Reviews at metacritic.com

2003 albums
Jason Molina albums
Secretly Canadian albums
Albums produced by Steve Albini